= Tengoku no Ragnarok =

Japanese manga series

- First tankōbon volume cover

天黒のラグナロク (Tengoku no Ragunaroku)
- Genre: Dark fantasy
- Manga
- Written by: Yūki Imada
- Published by: Shogakukan
- Imprint: Shōnen Sunday Comics Special
- Magazine: Sunday Webry
- Original run: April 4, 2017 – December 12, 2017
- Volumes: 4

Tengoku no Ragnarok (Japanese: 天黒のラグナロク, Hepburn: Tengoku no Ragunaroku), also known as Schwarz Ragnarok, is a Japanese web manga series written and illustrated by Yūki Imada. It was serialized on Shogakukan's online platform Sunday Webry from April to December 2017, with its chapters collected in four tankōbon volumes.

== Publication ==
Written and illustrated by Yūki Imada, Tengoku no Ragnarok was serialized on Shogakukan's online platform Sunday Webry from April 4 to December 12, 2017. Shogakukan collected its chapters in four tankōbon volumes, released from September 12, 2017, to February 9, 2018.

The manga has been licensed in France by Kurokawa.
